Cowboy Trap is a British daytime television show on BBC One, originally hosted by Clive Holland, and later presented by Jonnie Irwin. It follows homeowners who have had cowboy builders who in some cases have rendered their homes uninhabitable (two cases in each show). The team addresses the problems and usually confront the cowboy builder by a phone call, though this is not always successful. The show's second series replaced To Buy or Not to Buy.

Series overview
Five series comprising 130 episodes have been broadcast.

See also
 Holmes on Homes, a similar show in Canada

References

External links

2009 British television series debuts
2013 British television series endings
BBC Television shows